This is a list of the 1982 PGA Tour Qualifying School graduates. 50 players earned their 1983 PGA Tour card through Q-School in 1982. The tournament was played over 108 holes at the Tournament Players Club in Ponte Vedra, Florida. The top 30 players split the $50,000 purse, with the winner earning $9,000. This was the first qualifying school during the PGA Tour's the "All-exempt Tour" era. All graduates had full status on the PGA Tour the subsequent year.

Donnie Hammond won the event by a record breaking margin.

Mac O'Grady played in the PGA Tour Qualifying Tournament for the 17th time. He had been unsuccessful the first 16 times. He opened poorly with rounds of 79–76. However, he "steadied" with a "brilliant" fourth round 66. In the sixth and final round, he shot a 73 to earn his card for the first time.

Charlie Bolling attempted to earn playing privileges for the second straight year. He missed graduating by one shot this time.

Source:

References

PGA Tour Qualifying School
Golf in Florida
PGA Tour Qualifying School Graduates
PGA Tour Qualifying School Graduates